Katalin Fogl (born 7 November 1983 in Budapest) is a Hungarian football forward currently playing in the Hungarian First Division for Astra Hungary FC. With 1. FC Femina she has played the Champions League. She is a member of the Hungarian national team.

References

1983 births
Living people
Hungarian women's footballers
Hungary women's international footballers
László Kórház SC players
1. FC Femina players
Újpesti TE (women) players
Astra Hungary FC players
Women's association football forwards
Footballers from Budapest